Lewis Coleman Cohen, Baron Cohen of Brighton (28 March 1897 – 21 October 1966) was a British politician.  Cohen was elected as a Labour councillor and Mayor to Brighton Borough Council.  On the council he specialised in housing and worked together with Howard Johnson (a Conservative councillor) to support a local housing association.  Cohen and Johnson also knew each other through business.  Cohen was created a life peer on 13 May 1965 taking the title Baron Cohen of Brighton, of Brighton in the County of Sussex.

He was the founder of the Alliance Building Society and had many building projects which were ahead of their time in Brighton and wider Sussex.

References

1897 births
1966 deaths
Councillors in East Sussex
English solicitors
Labour Party (UK) life peers
Place of birth missing
Place of death missing
20th-century English lawyers
Life peers created by Elizabeth II